Onitis singhalensis, is a species of dung beetle found in India, Sri Lanka, and Pakistan.

Description
This elongate-oval and less convex species has an average length of about 19 to 22 mm. Body coppery or greenish-coppery. Head rather closely granular. Clypeus slightly bidentate in the middle of the front margin. Pronotum fairly strongly but unevenly punctured. Elytra moderately strongly striate with very minutely punctured intervals. Pygidium scarcely perceptibly punctured. Male has elongate front legs, slender tibia, strongly produced at the apex, with four short teeth. Female has longer and more rugulose clypeus, broad front tibia with four strong external teeth.

Adults are frequently observed in fresh cow dung.

References 

Scarabaeinae
Beetles of Sri Lanka
Insects described in 1875